Bulbophyllum lilianae, commonly known as the warty strand orchid, is a species of epiphytic or lithophytic orchid that is endemic to tropical North Queensland. It has widely spaced, deeply grooved, dark green to yellowish pseudobulbs, thin but tough, dark green to yellowish leaves and up to three cream-coloured, pale green or reddish flowers with dark red stripes and a pink labellum. It grows on shrubs, trees and rocks, often in exposed situations.

Description
Flowering occurs between July and September.

Taxonomy and naming
Bulbophyllum lilianae was first formally described in 1917 by Alfred Barton Rendle and the description was published in the Journal of Botany, British and Foreign from a specimen collected near the summit of Mount Bellenden Ker.

Distribution and habitat
The warty strand orchid grows on shrubs, trees and rocks, often in situations where it is exposed to full sun and wind or mist and fog. It occurs between the Cedar Bay National Park, the Evelyn Tableland and Paluma Range National Park.

References

lilianae
Orchids of Queensland
Endemic orchids of Australia
Plants described in 1917